Derek Anthony Cooper (born 11 December 1943), known as Tony Cooper, is a former British trade union leader.

Early life
Cooper was educated at Whitehaven Grammar School and the University of Edinburgh.

Career
He worked for the Forestry Commission.  In 1976, he switched careers, becoming a negotiations officer with the Institution of Professional Civil Servants (IPCS).  Three years later, he became an assistant secretary of the union, then Assistant General Secretary in 1982, and Deputy General Secretary in 1987.

In 1991, Cooper was elected as General Secretary of the rival Engineers' and Managers' Association.  However, he remained keen to build links between it and the IPMS, leading in 2001 to the two unions merging to form Prospect, of which Cooper served as Joint General Secretary for the first year.  He also served on the General Council of the Trades Union Congress from 1997 to 2000.

Cooper served on a large number of committees, including the Nuclear Decommissioning Authority, Postal Services Commission and the Forestry Commission, the Government Energy Advisory Panel, and the European Union Energy Consultative, Strategy and Investment Committees.  He retired from the last of his posts in 2015.

Personal life
Cooper's daughter, Yvette Cooper, is a Labour Party Member of Parliament and former Cabinet minister.

References

1943 births
Living people
Alumni of the University of Edinburgh
British trade union leaders
Members of the General Council of the Trades Union Congress
People from Whitehaven